Dr. Herbert Weissbach NAS NAI AAM (born 16 March 1932) is an American biochemist/molecular biologist.

He was born in the Bronx, New York City, where he spent his childhood. He is one of 3 children, having a younger sister Carol and an older brother Arthur, also a biochemist. He obtained his high school diploma from the Bronx High School of Science and a B.S. degree, majoring in chemistry, from the City College of New York (1953).

Upon graduation, he was recruited by Dr. Sidney Udenfriend to the National Heart Institute of National Institutes of Health (NIH) to enter a new joint graduate program between the NIH and George Washington University. He received his Ph.D. from George Washington University (Thesis: Studies on 5-Hydroxyindole Metabolism, 1957) based on research done at the NIH in the Udenfriend laboratory. In 1958 the NIH supported his postdoctoral studies done with Dr. H.A. Barker at the University of California at Berkeley, where he was involved in the discovery of the coenzyme form of vitamin B12.

In 1959 he returned to the NIH as an independent investigator where he continued his studies on the role of vitamin B12 in methionine biosynthesis, research that helped to elucidate the known inter-relationship among vitamin 12, folic acid and one carbon metabolism. The studies on methionine synthesis led to his collaboration with the Nirenberg laboratory at the NIH shortly after the genetic code was cracked.

By 1967 the Weissbach laboratory was deeply involved in protein synthesis (translation)  at which time he accepted a position as Associate Director of the RIMB to help found the Roche Institute of Molecular Biology (RIMB) with Sidney Udenfriend, and in 1983 he became Director of the RIMB and a Vice-President of Research at Hoffmann- La Roche, Nutley, NJ. The RIMB was involved in the very early days of the emergence of the biotechnology industry and was instrumental in helping Hoffmann-La Roche enter this field. Weissbach described this period at Roche in a book he co-authored with David Fisher in 2016 titled “A Camelot of the Biomedical Sciences: The Story of the Roche Institute of Molecular Biology”.

After the RIMB closed, in 1997 he accepted a position as Distinguished Research Professor at Florida Atlantic University (FAU) REFF, where he founded, and was Director, of the Center for Molecular Biology and Biotechnology  (CMBB) for 20 years. In 2017 he was appointed Distinguished Research Professor Emeritus at FAU. His most recent research has involved understanding the mechanisms that cells use to protect against oxidative damage, based on the observation that cells have a mechanism to protect against oxidative damage to methionine residues in proteins

Notable awards
       Election to the National Academy of Sciences (1982–Present)
 	300 most cited authors (1961-1976), Current Content July 10, 1978
 	Superior Service Award of the Department of Health Education and Welfare (1968)
 	Pfizer Award in Enzyme Chemistry(1970)
 	Townsend Harris Medal of the City College of New York Alumni Association (1988)
 	George Washington University Distinguished Alumni Award (1994)
	Member of the American Academy of Microbiology (1997)
 	Charter Fellow of the National Academy of inventors (2012)
   BioFlorida Lifetime Achievement Award

Notes

1932 births
American biochemists
American molecular biologists
The Bronx High School of Science alumni
Columbian College of Arts and Sciences alumni
City College of New York alumni
Living people
Scientists from the Bronx